Edward G. Burton (1869 – after 1891) was an English professional footballer who played in the Football Alliance for Small Heath. Born in the Acocks Green district of Birmingham, he played for Highfield Villa before joining Small Heath. A centre forward, he played only once for the club, deputising for the injured Harry Morris, and soon returned to local football. Burton died in Birmingham.

References

1869 births
Year of death missing
Footballers from Birmingham, West Midlands
English footballers
Association football forwards
Birmingham City F.C. players
Date of birth missing
Football Alliance players